"Back Door Man" is a blues song written by Willie Dixon and recorded by Howlin' Wolf in 1960. The lyrics draw on a Southern U.S. cultural term for an extramarital affair.  The song is one of several Dixon-Wolf songs that became popular among rock musicians, including the Doors who recorded it for their 1967 self-titled debut album.

Lyrics
In Southern culture, the phrase "back-door man" refers to a man having an affair with a married woman, using the back door as an exit before the husband comes home. Dixon's lyrics include:

The philandering "back-door man" is a theme of several blues songs, including those by Charley Patton, Lightnin' Hopkins, Blind Willie McTell and Sara Martin: "every sensible woman got a back-door man", Martin sang in "Strange Loving Blues" (1925).

Recording and releases
"Back Door Man" was recorded in Chicago in June 1960.  Accompanying Howlin' Wolf on vocals is Otis Spann on piano, Hubert Sumlin on guitar, Willie Dixon on double bass, and Fred Below on drums. Both Freddie King and Freddy Robinson have been suggested as the second guitarist.  The song features a modal arrangement, where it "hangs on one chord, hinging on an infectious and insistent riff [which] is similar to his own one-chord songs like 'I Asked for Water (She Gave Me Gasoline)' and 'Spoonful'", according to AllMusic reviewer Bill Janovitz.

Chess Records issued the song as the B-side to "Wang Dang Doodle" and included it on his second compilation album Howlin' Wolf (1962). Wolf later re-recorded the song for Chess' 1969 attempt to reach the rock audience, The Howlin' Wolf Album.

The Doors version

The Doors recorded "Back Door Man" for their 1967 self-titled debut album. Doors' guitarist Robby Krieger introduced the other members of the group to a blues rock adaptation of version of the song recorded by John Hammond Jr. for his 1964 album Big City Blues. The Doors' version also incorporates elements of psychedelic blues and hard rock.   Drummer John Densmore described it as a song that is "deeply sexual and got everyone moving."

Unlike Howlin' Wolf's one-chord arrangement, the Doors utilize a different approach.  Critic Bill Janovitz described it as a "thumping rhythmic approach. They vary the chords in a 12-bar blues arrangement, which serves as a great tension-and-release pattern." 

Jim Morrison provides the vocal, backed by Ray Manzarek on keyboards, Krieger on guitar, and Densmore on drums. Krieger asserts that he played bass guitar for the recording.  A live recording of the song appears as a part of a medley, on the Doors' live album Absolutely Live (1970).

References

Sources

Blues songs
1960 songs
1961 singles
Willie Dixon songs
Howlin' Wolf songs
The Doors songs
Songs written by Willie Dixon
Songs about infidelity
Chess Records singles